Falange Española (FE; English: Spanish Phalanx) was a Spanish fascist political organization active from 1933 to 1934.

History 

The Falange Española was created on 29 October 1933 as the successor of the Movimiento Español Sindicalista (MES), a similar organization founded earlier in 1933. In February 1934, after poor results at the ballots in the 1933 election, José Antonio Primo de Rivera suggested a fusion of Falange Española with the Ramiro Ledesma's Juntas de Ofensiva Nacional-Sindicalista, which was approved on 15 February. The Falange Española de las JONS (FE de las JONS) was subsequently formed.

The Falange's first clash with Marxist groups took place on 5 November 1933, when its militants had a rift with socialist sympathizers at a football game in Almoradí (Province of Alicante).

References

Bibliography 
 
 
 
 
 

1933 establishments in Spain
1934 disestablishments in Spain
Defunct nationalist parties in Spain
Falangist parties
Fascist parties in Spain
Political parties established in 1933
Political parties disestablished in 1934